Hilal Saeed (born March 24, 1982) is an Emirati footballer who plays as a defender .

Club career
Hilal was transferred to Al-Ain from Al-Fujairah in 2007, and quickly won his place in the starting eleven throughout the season and had an impressive season. Not only did Hilal improve the defence, but also the attack where he would help in set pieces due to his heading abilities. His only goal with Al-Ain was against fellow rivals Al-Wahda.

References

1982 births
Living people
Emirati footballers
Al Ain FC players
Al-Nasr SC (Dubai) players
Fujairah FC players
Emirates Club players
UAE First Division League players
UAE Pro League players
Association football defenders